Bernouilli Conservation Reserve is a protected area located in the Australian state of South Australia in the gazetted locality of Cape Jaffa about  south west of the township of Kingston SE in the state's Limestone Coast region. The conservation reserve was proclaimed under the Crown Lands Act 1929 on 11 November 1993. The name is derived from Cap Bernouilli, the former name of the headland of Cape Jaffa. The conservation reserve is classified as an IUCN Category VI protected area.

See also
Protected areas of South Australia
Conservation reserves of South Australia

References

External links
Entry for Bernouilli Conservation Reserve on protected planet
Webpage on the BirdsSA website

Conservation reserves of South Australia
Protected areas established in 1993
1993 establishments in Australia